Elias Farah (October 1, 1927 – December 8, 2013) was a Syrian writer and thinker born in the city of Jisr al-Shughur. He came from a Christian Orthodox family and spent much of his early life in Aleppo. Upon graduating with a degree in literature from Syrian University, he started his teaching career in Aleppo. Later on, Farah pursued his graduate studies at the University of Geneva in Switzerland, where he studied under professor Jean Piaget and earned a doctorate in education and psychology in 1964. In 1947, he became one of the founding members of the Syrian Ba'ath Party. He was also was one of the closest companions of the party founder, Michel Aflaq.

Farah left Syria after the 1966 Syrian coup d'état which was carried out by the military wing of the Ba'ath party and led by Salah Jadid as well as the eventual Syrian president, Hafez al-Assad. Farah fled to Lebanon and lived there for two years before later moving to Iraq, where he continued his work in the Ba'ath Party. As Aflaq's age advanced, he withdrew more from party work, and from 1978 onwards, Farah was given the reigns to decide the ideological orientation of the party. After Aflaq's death in 1989, Iraqi President Saddam Hussein became the new general secretary of the Ba'ath Party and appointed Farah as the director of the party academy in Baghdad. Farah returned to his native Syria in 2003 and settled in the capital of Damascus. Due to the civil war in Syria, Farah moved to Dubai in April 2013. There, he died just a few months later on December 6th, 2013 at the age of 86.

Elias Farah wrote several books about Arab nationalism and the subject of Arab thoughts and ideology, as advocated by the Ba’ath Party, many of which were translated to several languages.

Works
 Arab World after the Second World War, (Beirut, 1975)
References

1927 births
2013 deaths
Members of the National Command of the Ba'ath Party
Syrian Arab nationalists
Syrian writers